The 2023 Minnesota Golden Gophers football team will represent the University of Minnesota in the West Division of the Big Ten Conference during the 2022 NCAA Division I FBS football season. The Golden Gophers are expected to be led by P. J. Fleck in his seventh year as head coach. They play their home games at Huntington Bank Stadium in Minneapolis.

Schedule

References

Minnesota
Minnesota Golden Gophers football seasons
Minnesota Golden Gophers football